Potassium nitrate is a chemical compound with a sharp, salty, bitter taste and the chemical formula . This alkali metal nitrate salt is also known as Indian saltpetre (large deposits of which were historically mined in India). It is an ionic salt of potassium ions K+ and nitrate ions NO3−, and is therefore an alkali metal nitrate. It occurs in nature as a mineral, niter (or nitre in the UK). It is a source of nitrogen, and nitrogen was named after niter. Potassium nitrate is one of several nitrogen-containing compounds collectively referred to as saltpeter (or saltpetre in the UK).

Major uses of potassium nitrate are in fertilizers, tree stump removal, rocket propellants and fireworks. It is one of the major constituents of gunpowder (black powder). In processed meats, potassium nitrate reacts with hemoglobin and myoglobin generating a red color.

Etymology
Potash, or potassium nitrate, because of its early and global use and production, has many names. The chemical potassium was first isolated by the chemist Sir Humphry Davy, from pot ash. This refers to an early method of extracting various potassium salts: by placing in an iron pot the ash of burnt wood or tree leaves, adding water, heating, and evaporating the solution.
As for nitrate, Hebrew and Egyptian words for it had the consonants n-t-r, indicating likely cognation in the Greek nitron, which was Latinised to nitrum or nitrium. Thence Old French had niter and Middle English nitre. By the 15th century, Europeans referred to it as saltpetre, specifically Indian saltpetre (sodium nitrate is chile saltpetre) and later as nitrate of potash, as the chemistry of the compound was more fully understood.

The Arabs called it "Chinese snow". It was called "Chinese salt" by the Iranians/Persians or "salt from Chinese salt marshes".

Historical production

From mineral sources
In Ancient India, saltpeter manufacturers formed the Nuniya caste. Saltpeter finds mention in Kautilya's Arthashastra (compiled 300BC - 300AD), which mentions using its poisonous smoke as a weapon of war, although its use for propulsion did not appear until medieval times.

A purification process for potassium nitrate was outlined in 1270 by the chemist and engineer Hasan al-Rammah of Syria in his book al-Furusiyya wa al-Manasib al-Harbiyya (The Book of Military Horsemanship and Ingenious War Devices). In this book, al-Rammah describes first the purification of barud (crude saltpeter mineral) by boiling it with minimal water and using only the hot solution, then the use of potassium carbonate (in the form of wood ashes) to remove calcium and magnesium by precipitation of their carbonates from this solution, leaving a solution of purified potassium nitrate, which could then be dried. This was used for the manufacture of gunpowder and explosive devices. The terminology used by al-Rammah indicated the gunpowder he wrote about originated in China.

At least as far back as 1845, nitratite deposits were exploited in Chile and California.

From caves
Major natural sources of potassium nitrate were the deposits crystallizing from cave walls and the accumulations of bat guano in caves. Extraction is accomplished by immersing the guano in water for a day, filtering, and harvesting the crystals in the filtered water. Traditionally, guano was the source used in Laos for the manufacture of gunpowder for Bang Fai rockets.

Nitraries 

Potassium nitrate was produced in a nitrary. The process involved burial of excrements (human or animal) in a field beside the nitraries, watering them and waiting until leaching allowed saltpeter to come to the ground surface by efflorescence. Operators then gathered the resulting powder and transported it to be concentrated by ebullition in the boiler plant.

Besides "Montepellusanus", during the thirteenth century (and beyond) the only supply of saltpeter across Christian Europe (according to "De Alchimia" in 3 manuscripts of Michael Scot, 1180–1236) was "found in Spain in Aragon in a certain mountain near the sea".

In 1561, Elizabeth I of England, at war with Philip II of Spain, became unable to import saltpeter (of which the Kingdom of England had no home production), and had to pay "300 pounds gold" to the German captain Gerrard Honrik for the manual "Instructions for making salpeter to growe" (the secret of the "Feuerwerkbuch" -the nitraries-).

Nitre bed 
A nitre bed is a similar process used to produce nitrate from excrement. Unlike the leaching-based process of the nitrary, however, one mixes the excrements with soil and waits for soil microbes to convert amino-nitrogen into nitrates by nitrification. The nitrates are extracted from soil with water and then purified into saltpeter by adding wood ash. The process was discovered in the early 15th century and was very widely used until the Chilean mineral deposits were found.

The Confederate side of the American Civil War had a significant shortage of saltpeter. As a result, the Nitre and Mining Bureau was set up to encourage local production, including by nitre beds and by providing excrement to government nitraries. On November 13, 1862, the government advertised in the Charleston Daily Courier for 20 or 30 "able bodied Negro men" to work in the new nitre beds at Ashley Ferry, S.C. The nitre beds were large rectangles of rotted manure and straw, moistened weekly with urine, "dung water", and liquid from privies, cesspools and drains, and turned over regularly. The National Archives published payroll records that account for more than 29,000 people compelled to such labor in the state of Virginia. The South was so desperate for saltpeter for gunpowder that one Alabama official reportedly placed a newspaper ad asking that the contents of chamber pots be saved for collection. In South Carolina, in April 1864, the Confederate government forced 31 enslaved people to work at the Ashley Ferry Nitre Works, outside Charleston.

Perhaps the most exhaustive discussion of the niter-bed production is the 1862 LeConte text. He was writing with the express purpose of increasing production in the Confederate States to support their needs during the American Civil War. Since he was calling for the assistance of rural farming communities, the descriptions and instructions are both simple and explicit. He details the "French Method", along with several variations, as well as a "Swiss method". N.B. Many references have been made to a method using only straw and urine, but there is no such method in this work.

French method
Turgot and Lavoisier created the Régie des Poudres et Salpêtres a few years before the French Revolution. The heap was usually under a cover from the rain, kept moist with urine, turned often to accelerate the decomposition, then finally leached with water after approximately one year, to remove the soluble calcium nitrate which was then converted to potassium nitrate by filtering through potash.

Swiss method
LeConte describes a process using only urine and not dung, referring to it as the Swiss method. Urine is collected directly, in a sandpit under a stable. The sand itself is dug out and leached for nitrates which were then converted to potassium nitrate using potash, as above.

From nitric acid
From 1903 until the World War I era, potassium nitrate for black powder and fertilizer was produced on an industrial scale from nitric acid produced using the Birkeland–Eyde process, which used an electric arc to oxidize nitrogen from the air. During World War I the newly industrialized Haber process (1913) was combined with the Ostwald process after 1915, allowing Germany to produce nitric acid for the war after being cut off from its supplies of mineral sodium nitrates from Chile (see nitratite).

Modern production
Potassium nitrate can be made by combining ammonium nitrate and potassium hydroxide.

NH4NO3 (aq) + KOH (aq) → NH3 (g) + KNO3 (aq) + H2O (l)

An alternative way of producing potassium nitrate without a by-product of ammonia is to combine ammonium nitrate, found in instant ice packs, and potassium chloride, easily obtained as a sodium-free salt substitute.

NH4NO3 (aq) + KCl (aq) → NH4Cl (aq) + KNO3 (aq)

Potassium nitrate can also be produced by neutralizing nitric acid with potassium hydroxide. This reaction is highly exothermic.

KOH (aq) + HNO3 → KNO3 (aq) + H2O (l)

On industrial scale it is prepared by the double displacement reaction between sodium nitrate and potassium chloride.
NaNO3 (aq) + KCl (aq) → NaCl (aq) + KNO3 (aq)

Properties

Sodium nitrate is isomorphous with calcite, the most stable form of calcium carbonate, whereas room-temperature potassium nitrate is isomorphous with aragonite, a slightly less stable polymorph of calcium carbonate. The difference is attributed to the similarity in size between nitrate and carbonate ions and the fact that the potassium ion is larger than sodium and calcium ions.

In the room-temperature structure of potassium nitrate, each potassium ion is surrounded by 6 nitrate ions. In turn, each nitrate ion is surrounded by 6 potassium ions.

Potassium nitrate is moderately soluble in water, but its solubility increases with temperature. It is not very hygroscopic, absorbing about 0.03% water in 80% relative humidity over 50 days. It is insoluble in alcohol and is not poisonous; it can react explosively with reducing agents, but it is not explosive on its own.

Thermal decomposition
Between , potassium nitrate reaches a temperature-dependent equilibrium with potassium nitrite:
2 KNO3  2 KNO2 + O2

Uses
Potassium nitrate has a wide variety of uses, largely as a source of nitrate.

Nitric acid production
Historically, nitric acid was produced by combining sulfuric acid with nitrates such as saltpeter. In modern times this is reversed: nitrates are produced from nitric acid produced via the Ostwald process.

Oxidizer

The most famous use of potassium nitrate is probably as the oxidizer in blackpowder. From the most ancient times until the late 1880s, blackpowder provided the explosive power for all the world's firearms. After that time, small arms and large artillery increasingly began to depend on cordite, a smokeless powder. Blackpowder remains in use today in black powder rocket motors, but also in combination with other fuels like sugars in "rocket candy" (a popular amateur rocket fuel). It is also used in fireworks such as smoke bombs. It is also added to cigarettes to maintain an even burn of the tobacco and is used to ensure complete combustion of paper cartridges for cap and ball revolvers. It can also be heated to several hundred degrees to be used for niter bluing, which is less durable than other forms of protective oxidation, but allows for specific and often beautiful coloration of steel parts, such as screws, pins, and other small parts of firearms.

Meat processing
Potassium nitrate has been a common ingredient of salted meat since antiquity or the Middle Ages. The widespread adoption of nitrate use is more recent and is linked to the development of large-scale meat processing. The use of potassium nitrate has been mostly discontinued because of slow and inconsistent results compared to sodium nitrite compounds such as "Prague powder" or pink "curing salt". Even so, potassium nitrate is still used in some food applications, such as salami, dry-cured ham, charcuterie, and (in some countries) in the brine used to make corned beef (sometimes together with sodium nitrite). When used as a food additive in the European Union, the compound is referred to as E252; it is also approved for use as a food additive in the United States and Australia and New Zealand (where it is listed under its INS number 252).

Food preparation
In West African cuisine, potassium nitrate (saltpetre) is widely used as a thickening agent in soups and stews such as okra soup and isi ewu. It is also used to soften food and reduce cooking time when boiling beans and tough meat. Saltpetre is also an essential ingredient in making special porridges, such as kunun kanwa literally translated from the Hausa language as "saltpetre porridge".

In the Shetland Islands (UK) it is used in the curing of mutton to make reestit mutton, a local delicacy.

Fertilizer
Potassium nitrate is used in fertilizers as a source of nitrogen and potassium – two of the macronutrients for plants. When used by itself, it has an NPK rating of 13-0-44.

Pharmacology
 Used in some toothpastes for sensitive teeth. Recently, the use of potassium nitrate in toothpastes for treating sensitive teeth has increased.
 Used historically to treat asthma. Used in some toothpastes to relieve asthma symptoms.
 Used in Thailand as main ingredient in kidney tablets to relieve the symptoms of cystitis, pyelitis and urethritis.
 Combats high blood pressure and was once used as a hypotensive.

Other uses
 Electrolyte in a salt bridge
 Active ingredient of condensed aerosol fire suppression systems. When burned with the free radicals of a fire's flame, it produces potassium carbonate.
 Works as an aluminium cleaner.
 Component (usually about 98%) of some tree stump removal products. It accelerates the natural decomposition of the stump by supplying nitrogen for the fungi attacking the wood of the stump.
 In heat treatment of metals as a medium temperature molten salt bath, usually in combination with sodium nitrite. A similar bath is used to produce a durable blue/black finish typically seen on firearms. Its oxidizing quality, water solubility, and low cost make it an ideal short-term rust inhibitor.
 To induce flowering of mango trees in the Philippines.
 Thermal storage medium in power generation systems. Sodium and potassium nitrate salts are stored in a molten state with the solar energy collected by the heliostats at the Gemasolar Thermosolar Plant. Ternary salts, with the addition of calcium nitrate or lithium nitrate, have been found to improve the heat storage capacity in the molten salts.
 As a source of potassium ions for exchange with sodium ions in chemically strengthened glass.
 As an oxidizer in model rocket fuel called Rocket candy.

In folklore and popular culture
Potassium nitrate was once thought to induce impotence, and is still rumored to be in institutional food (such as military fare) as an anaphrodisiac; however, there is no scientific evidence for such properties.

In Bank Shot, El (Joanna Cassidy) propositions Walter Ballantine (George C. Scott), who tells her that he has been fed saltpeter in prison. "You know why they feed you saltpeter in prison?" Ballantine asks her. She shakes her head no. They kiss. He glances down at his crotch, making a gesture that reveals his body has not responded to her advances, and says, "That's why they feed you saltpeter in prison."

In One Flew Over the Cuckoo's Nest, Randle is asked by the nurses to take his medications, but not knowing what they are, he mentions he does not want anyone to "slip me saltpeter". He then proceeds to imitate the motions of masturbation in reference to its supposed effects as an anaphrodisiac.

In 1776, John Adams asks his wife Abigail to make saltpeter for the Continental Army. She, eventually, is able to do so in exchange for pins for sewing.

In the Star Trek episode "Arena", Captain Kirk injures a gorn using a rudimentary cannon that he constructs using potassium nitrate as a key ingredient of gunpowder.

In 21 Jump Street, Jenko, played by Channing Tatum, gives a rhyming presentation about potassium nitrate for his chemistry class.

In Eating Raoul, Paul hires a dominatrix to impersonate a nurse and trick Raoul into consuming saltpeter in a ploy to reduce his sexual appetite for his wife.

In The Simpsons episode "El Viaje Misterioso de Nuestro Jomer (The Mysterious Voyage of Homer)", Mr. Burns is seen pouring saltpeter into his chili entry, titled Old Elihu's Yale-Style Saltpeter Chili.

In the Sharpe novel series by Bernard Cornwell, numerous mentions are made of an advantageous supply of saltpeter from India being a crucial component of British military supremacy in the Napoleonic Wars. In Sharpe's Havoc, the French Captain Argenton laments that France need to scrape their supply from cesspits.

In the Dr Stone anime and manga series, the struggle for control over a natural saltpeter source from guano features prominently in the plot.

In the farming lore from the Corn Belt of the 1800s, drought-killed corn in manured fields could accumulate saltpeter to the extent that upon opening the stalk for examination it would "fall as a fine powder upon the table".

See also
History of gunpowder
Humberstone and Santa Laura Saltpeter Works
Niter, a mineral form of potassium nitrate
Nitratine
Nitrocellulose
Potassium perchlorate

References

Bibliography

 David Cressy. Saltpeter: The Mother of Gunpowder (Oxford University Press, 2013) 237 pp online review by Robert Tiegs 
Alan Williams. "The production of saltpeter in the Middle Ages", Ambix, 22 (1975), pp. 125–33. Maney Publishing, ISSN 0002-6980.

External links

International Chemical Safety Card 018402216

Gunpowder
Inorganic fertilizers
Nitrates
Potassium compounds
Preservatives
Pyrotechnic oxidizers
E-number additives